This is a list of the world's best-selling albums of 2013. According to IFPI, the best-selling album of 2013 was Midnight Memories, selling 4.0 million copies worldwide. Both physical and digital album sales are included.

List of best-selling albums

See also

List of best-selling albums of 2014
List of best-selling albums
List of best-selling singles
List of best-selling albums by country
Lists of albums
List of best-selling albums of the 21st century

References

2013 in music